The 1968 Toledo Rockets football team was an American football team that represented the University of Toledo in the Mid-American Conference (MAC) during the 1968 NCAA University Division football season. In their sixth season under head coach Frank Lauterbur, the Rockets compiled a 5–4–1 record (3–2–1 against MAC opponents), and outscored all opponents by a combined total of 230 to 156. Toledo won the first three games of the season, part of a 12-game winning streak that extended back into the 1967 season.

The team's statistical leaders on offense included Steve Jones with 1,197 passing yards, Roland Moss with 1,145 rushing yards and 84 points scored, and David Daniels with 344 receiving yards. Mel Tucker and Bob Pfefferle were the team captains.

Schedule

References

Toledo
Toledo Rockets football seasons
Toledo Rockets football